Manuel de Pedrolo i Molina (1918 – 1990) was a spanish author of novels, short stories, poetry and plays. He's mostly known for his sci-fi novel Mecanoscrit del segon origen (Typescript of the Second Origin).

Mini-biography

Manuel de Pedrolo was born in 1918 in L'Aranyó, in the Segarra comarca (county), in Catalonia. After the Spanish civil war he settled down in Barcelona, where he worked at a great number of jobs while writing as a background activity. From 1974, he was able to devote himself to literature, creating works, translating, and doing other minor editorial tasks. He died in Barcelona, in 1990, after suffering a long illness.

Work

Despite the fact that he is considered one of the most ambitious writers in Catalan, having cultivated virtually all literary genres, Manuel de Pedrolo is especially known for his vast production of prose, with more than 72 novels published between 1949 and 1985, many of which were detective novels. Most of them were thoroughly censored under the following terms: "catalanism, political opinions, religion, sexual morality and indecorous language". He also translated into Catalan works by John Dos Passos, William Faulkner and Jean-Paul Sartre. Throughout his life, he had several run-ins with Spanish fascists around censorship issues. He also received many awards and was bestowed with the highest honors in Catalan literature.

Mecanoscrit del segon origen

Pedrolo's name will remain forever attached to the title of his most popular work, his first attempt at the sci-fi genre, Mecanoscrit del segon origen ("Typescript of the Second Origin"). First published in 1974, it became the most broadly disseminated Catalan fiction book in the following decade, with 26 editions and more than 270,000 copies sold in 1986.

The novel narrates the story of two children from a little country village named Benaura in Catalonia, Spain. Alba, a fourteen-year-old girl, and Dídac, a black nine-year-old boy, become the two only remaining humans on Earth after they accidentally survive an alien holocaust that eradicates all mammal life on the planet. As Alba and Dídac bravely recover from the catastrophe, they not only insist on living in a post-apocalyptic world, inhabited by myriads of corpses and deranged, psychotic survivors, but they also take up the mission of preserving human culture and repopulating the Earth.

Although the novel was not addressed to youngsters, the dramatic and yet romantically attractive position of the main characters made the Mecanoscrit very popular among teenagers, and even though it is compulsory reading in many Catalan highschools today, many young people will have already read it at an earlier age. From an adult perspective, Alba & Dídac's will to survive makes this novel a wonderful chant to life and hope. The well-documented scientific data and the use of cultured-but-readable language are just two of the reasons for the success of this book, which has had a deep impact on Catalan culture.

Notes

References
All contents in this article come from different editions of Manuel de Pedrolo's books: 
Manuel de Pedrolo: Mecanoscrit del segon Origen. Barcelona: Edicions 62, 1986. (A special edition for La Caixa, with a foreword by Francesc Vallverdú.)
Manuel de Pedrolo: Mecanoscrit del segon Origen. Barcelona: Edicions 62, 1996. (Edited by Carme Ballús Molina.)

External links
 

1918 births
1990 deaths
People from Segarra
Catalan-language writers
Catalan-language poets
Novelists from Catalonia
Writers from Barcelona
Speculative fiction writers from Catalonia
Short story writers from Catalonia
Poets from Catalonia
Translators to Catalan
Translators from Catalonia
20th-century translators
20th-century Spanish novelists
20th-century Spanish poets
20th-century Spanish male writers
Spanish male poets
Male novelists
20th-century short story writers